Grace Edwards may refer to:

 Grace F. Edwards (1933–2020), American mystery writer 
 Grace Edwards (producer), Guyanese-American producer, screenwriter, and actress